Natasha Kate Fyles (born 26 May 1978) is an Australian politician and former teacher serving as the 12th and current chief minister of the Northern Territory and minister for Health. She has been the leader of the Northern Territory branch of the Australian Labor Party (ALP) since May 2022 and a member of the Northern Territory Legislative Assembly (MLA) for the division of Nightcliff since August 2012. She previously served as 22nd attorney-general of the Norther Territory and the territory’s minister for Justice from 2016 to 2020.

Prior to her election, Fyles trained as a teacher at the University of Canberra, and has worked as a physical education teacher and swimming coach. She is married to Paul Archbold and has two children.

Fyles was part of Labor’s landslide victory in the 2016 Northern Territory election and was reelected as the member for Nightcliff in the 2020 election holding the largest majority in the Northern Territory. Fyles is currently the Minister for Health, Minister for Tourism and Hospitality, Minister for Racing, Gaming and Licensing, Minister for Alcohol Policy, Minister for Major Events, Minister for the National Resilience Centre and Leader of Government Business.

Following Michael Gunner's resignation from the role of Chief Minister on 10 May 2022, Fyles was elected as his replacement by the Labor caucus on 13 May 2022.

Early life and career 
Fyles was born in Darwin in 1978 at the old Darwin hospital and grew up in the Northern suburbs. She completed her teaching degree at the University of Canberra and then returned to Darwin, teaching at St Mary’s Primary School for five years and was actively involved in School Sports NT during this time.

After travelling and working overseas she returned to the Territory as Executive Director of Royal Life Saving Society NT delivering water safety programs across the Territory in both urban and remote centres in the Northern Territory and also in the neighbouring Republic of Timor- Leste.

Natasha joined the Australian Labor Party in 1993. She is aligned with Labor Left.

Early political career 

|}

Member for Nightcliff 
In 2012 the incumbent Member for Nightcliff Jane Aagaard retired, and despite a swing against Labor at that year's election, the seat was retained for Labor by Fyles and she was elected to the Northern Territory Legislative Assembly as the Member for Nightcliff.

Labor's massive landslide at the 2016 election saw Fyles consolidate her hold on the seat with a healthy swing of 18 percent, ballooning her majority to 26.9 percent, making Nightcliff the safest seat in the Territory. This majority is attributed to her tireless work ethic in the electorate. Fyles was reelected as the Member for Nightcliff in 2020 with a majority of 24.9 percent, retaining her mantle as holding the safest seat in the Northern Territory.

2016 election

Minister for Health 
Labor went into the 2016 territory election as unbackable favourites, with Northern Territory opinion polls indicating a massive swing against the CLP. Labor won 18 seats in the 25-member Legislative Assembly. Fyles was reelected as the Member for Nightcliff and took on the portfolio of Health.

Attorney-General of the Northern Territory 
Fyles served as the Attorney-General of the Northern Territory from 31 August 2016 to 7 September 2020. She was succeeded by Selena Uibo.

2020 election 

Fyles was reelected as the Member for Nightcliff in 2020 holding the largest majority in any Northern Territory electorate. She has served as the Minister for Health in the Gunner ministry since 2016 and continues as the Northern Territory's Health Minister following the 22 August 2020 election, which saw the Labor government re-elected.

She was appointed as the Minister for National Resilience to work with the Australian federal government on making Darwin's highly-touted Howard Springs Quarantine Facility a ‘centre for national resilience’. This use of this facility is central to the repatriation of Australians stranded overseas due to COVID-19.

Fyles was the also the Leader of Government Business and the Minister for Alcohol Policy, Minister for Tourism and Hospitality, Minister for Major Events, and Minister for Racing, Gaming and Licensing.

Chief Minister of the Northern Territory

Chief Minister and Territory Labor leader Michael Gunner announced his resignation on 10 May 2022. Fyles was elected as party leader by the Labor caucus on 13 May 2022, and was sworn in as Chief Minister later that day.

References

1978 births
21st-century Australian politicians
21st-century Australian women politicians
Australian Labor Party members of the Northern Territory Legislative Assembly
Australian schoolteachers
Attorneys-General of the Northern Territory
Chief Ministers of the Northern Territory
Living people
Members of the Northern Territory Legislative Assembly
People from Darwin, Northern Territory
University of Canberra alumni
Women members of the Northern Territory Legislative Assembly
Labor Left politicians